Gyalectidium is a genus of lichen-forming fungi in the family Gomphillaceae. A 2020 estimates placed 52 species in the genus. The genus was circumscribed by Swiss lichenologist Johannes Müller Argoviensis in 1881. He included 3 species: G. xantholeucum, G. dispersum, and G. filicinum; the last of these is now the type species of the genus.

Species
Gyalectidium appendiculatum 
Gyalectidium areolatum 
Gyalectidium atrosquamulatum 
Gyalectidium aurelii 
Gyalectidium australe 
Gyalectidium barbatum  – Mexico
Gyalectidium catenulatum 
Gyalectidium caucasicum 
Gyalectidium chilense 
Gyalectidium ciliatum 
Gyalectidium cinereodiscus 
Gyalectidium conchiferum 
Gyalectidium denticulatum 
Gyalectidium fantasticum 
Gyalectidium filicinum 
Gyalectidium flabellatum 
Gyalectidium floridense  – Florida, USA
Gyalectidium fuscum 
Gyalectidium gahavisukanam 
Gyalectidium imperfectum 
Gyalectidium kenyanum 
Gyalectidium laciniatum 
Gyalectidium macaronesicum 
Gyalectidium maracae 
Gyalectidium membranaceum 
Gyalectidium microcarpum 
Gyalectidium minus 
Gyalectidium nashii 
Gyalectidium novoguineense 
Gyalectidium pallidum 
Gyalectidium paolae 
Gyalectidium plicatum 
Gyalectidium puntilloi 
Gyalectidium radiatum 
Gyalectidium rosae-emiliae 
Gyalectidium sanmartinense 
Gyalectidium shimanense  – Japan
Gyalectidium tuckerae  – Louisiana, USA
Gyalectidium ulloae  – Mexico
Gyalectidium verruculosum 
Gyalectidium viride  – Alabama, USA
Gyalectidium yahriae  – Florida, USA

References

Ostropales
Lichen genera
Ostropales genera
Taxa described in 1881
Taxa named by Johannes Müller Argoviensis